Hellen Abulu Obura, is a Ugandan judge on the Court of Appeal of Uganda, the second-highest judicial organ in the country, which also doubles as the nation's Constitutional Court. Immediately prior to her appointment to the appeals court, she served as a member of the High Court of Uganda.

Background, education and early career
She was born and educated in Uganda for her pre-university education. She earned a Bachelor of Laws (LLB) degree from Makerere University, the nation's oldest and largest public University. She also obtained a Diploma in Legal Practice, from the Law Development Centre, in Kampala, the country's capital city. For seventeen years, from 1993 until she was appointed as a high court judge, Justice Helen Obura had served in the Uganda Ministry of Justice and Constitutional Affairs. She was the Secretary to the Law Council at the time she was called to the bench in 2010.

Judicial career
Hellen Obura served as  judge on the High Court of Uganda, from October 2010, until September 2015, when she was appointed to the Court of Appeal, which also doubles as the Constitutional Court of Uganda.

See also
Solome Bossa
Stella Arach-Amoko
Esther Mayambala Kisaakye

References

Year of birth missing (living people)
Living people
Makerere University alumni
Law Development Centre alumni
Ugandan women judges
People from Northern Region, Uganda
Justices of the Court of Appeal of Uganda
20th-century Ugandan women
21st-century Ugandan women